Virginia Hawkins (February 1, 1934 - March 27, 2020) was an American actress, who remains best known for her role in the 1980s television series Dynasty as maid Jeanette Robbins.

She also appeared regularly in the series Medical Center and made guest appearances on shows such as The Love Boat, Vega$, Trapper John M.D., and Murder She Wrote.

Career

1960s to 1970s
In 1969, she had a small part in the "Lucy And Carol Burnett" episode of Here's Lucy.
She had a part in the 1970 biker exploitation film Cycle Savages that starred Bruce Dern, Chris Robinson, Melody Patterson, and Lee Chandler. In 1973, she appeared in Hawkins: Death and the Maiden, a TV movie that served as the pilot for the series Hawkins starring James Stewart.

1980s
She had a role in "The Victims" episode of Strike Force that aired  on 27 November 1981. From 1981 to 1989, she recurred on Dynasty as Jeanette Robbins, and appeared in the 1991 reunion miniseries 'Dynasty: The Reunion''.

References

External links
 

2020 deaths
American television actresses
21st-century American women
1934 births